The Consolidated Model 21 was an American two-seat training aircraft built by the Consolidated Aircraft Company. It was used by the United States Army Air Corps with the designation PT-11 and the United States Coast Guard under the designation N4Y.

Design and development
The Model 21 was an aerodynamic cleaned up version of the Model 12/PT-3, one of the distinguishing features being curved instead of angular tail surfaces. The aircraft was a single-engined biplane with fixed tailwheel landing gear and accommodation for two in open cockpits.

Operational history
Designated the PT-11 by the United States Army Air Corps it progressed through a number of trial variants but was not built in large numbers. 11 Examples of the model 21-C were built in Canada as the 21-M for Mexico but none were built for local use.

Variants
XPT-933
 (Model 21A). Prototype powered by  Kinner engine, first flew February 1931.
YPT-11
Evaluation aircraft for US Army based on the Model 21A with a  Continental R-545-1 engine, four built.
PT-11A
One YPT-11 was re-engined with a  Curtiss R-600-1 Challenger engine, originally as Y1PT-11A, later converted to PT-11C standard.
Y1PT-11B
One YPT-11 was re-engined with a  Kinner YR-720-1 engine and designated Y1PT-11B. 5 production aircraft for US Army with another for the United States Coast Guard and designated N4Y-1.
PT-11C
PT-11A re-engined with a  Lycoming YR-680-1 engine. One or two converted for US Army, with 18 new-build aircraft for Colombia.
PT-11D
Production version with  R-680-3 engine, originally designated Y1PT-11D. 21 new-built, plus five conversions from Y1PT11-Bs and two from Y1PT-11s.
PT-12
A version of the PT-11 with a 300hp R-985-1 engine and detailed changes, ten built later redesignated BT-7.

Y1BT-6
One YPT-11 was re-engined with a 300hp R-985-1
BT-6
Redesignation of Y1BT-6.

BT-7
PT-12 aircraft redesignated.
XN4Y-1
Evaluation aircraft for the United States Coast Guard, three built.
N4Y-1
One YPT-11B for the USCG, later modified to the same standard as the XN4Y-1

Operators

United States Army Air Corps
United States Coast Guard

Colombian Air Force (PT-11C).

Paraguayan Air Arm (Model 21-C).

Mexican Air Force (Model 21-M).

Specifications (PT-11D)

See also
Consolidated PT-3

References

PT-11
Consolidated PT-11
Single-engined tractor aircraft
Biplanes